Dominican Argentines are Argentine citizens of partial or full Dominican descent, or Dominican citizens who have migrated to and settled in Argentina. Although sources vary, as of 2013 were are an estimate 40,000 Dominican-Argentines, according to community organization Asociación de Dominicanos Residentes en Argentina.

Characteristics
Buenos Aires Province concentrates 30 percent of the Dominican emigrants.  The rest are spread across the remaining national territory.

According to the UN's International Organization for Migration, young women from the Dominican Republic began arriving to Argentina in unprecedented numbers in the 1990s as prostitutes, many of them  ending up in Buenos Aires.

References

Argentina
Ethnic groups in Argentina
Immigration to Argentina